11/2 may refer to:

November 2 (month-day date notation)
February 11 (day-month date notation)
February 11 AD (month-year date notation)
2 AD November (year-month date notation)
11 shillings and 2 pence in UK predecimal currency
A type of hendecagram

See also

 11 (disambiguation)
 2 (disambiguation)

 112 (disambiguation)
 2/11 (disambiguation) 
 211 (disambiguation)
 1/12 (disambiguation)